Artò is a frazione (and parish) of the municipality of Madonna del Sasso, in Piedmont, northern Italy.

Overview

It is a village located some km west from the Lake Orta.

History 
Since 1928 Artò was a separate comune (municipality).

References

External links

Frazioni of the Province of Verbano-Cusio-Ossola
Former municipalities of the Province of Verbano-Cusio-Ossola